Alan Riechelmann is a New Zealand rugby league footballer who represented New Zealand.

Playing career
A Marist player in the Auckland Rugby League competition, Riechelmann represented Auckland, touring the South Island in 1956 and 1958.

Riechelmann toured Australia with the New Zealand national rugby league team in 1952, but did not play in any of the three test matches.

References

Living people
New Zealand rugby league players
New Zealand national rugby league team players
Auckland rugby league team players
Marist Saints players
Rugby league centres
Place of birth missing (living people)
Year of birth missing (living people)